The 2019 Men's EuroHockey Championship II was the 8th edition of the Men's EuroHockey Championship II, the second level of the European field hockey championships organized by the European Hockey Federation. It was held from 28 July until 3 August 2019 in Cambrai, France. The tournament also served as a direct qualifier for the 2021 EuroHockey Championship, with the winner France and runner-up Russia qualifying.

The hosts France won their first EuroHockey Championship II title by defeating Russia 4–0 in the final. Austria won the bronze medal by defeating Poland 4–1.

Qualified teams
The following eight teams, shown with pre-tournament world rankings, competed in this tournament.

Format
The eight teams were split into two groups of four teams. The top two teams advanced to the semi-finals to determine the winner in a knockout system. The bottom two teams played in a new group with the teams they did not play against in the group stage. The last two teams were relegated to the EuroHockey Championship III.

Results
''All times are local, CEST (UTC+2).

Preliminary round

Pool A

Pool B

Fifth to eighth place classification

Pool C
The points obtained in the preliminary round against the other team are taken over.

First to fourth place classification

Semi-finals

Third and fourth place

Final

Statistics

Final standings

 Qualified for the 2021 EuroHockey Championship

 Relegated to the EuroHockey Championship III

Goalscorers

See also
2019 Men's EuroHockey Championship III
2019 Men's EuroHockey Nations Championship
2019 Women's EuroHockey Championship II

References

External links
FIH page

EuroHockey Championship II
Men 2
International field hockey competitions hosted by France
EuroHockey Championship II Men
EuroHockey Championship II Men
Sport in Nord (French department)
Cambrai